Jodłowa  is a village in Dębica County, Subcarpathian Voivodeship, in south-eastern Poland. It is the seat of the gmina (administrative district) called Gmina Jodłowa.

The village has a population of 4,100.

References

Villages in Dębica County
Kraków Voivodeship (14th century – 1795)
Populated places in the Kingdom of Galicia and Lodomeria
Kraków Voivodeship (1919–1939)